Irvington Historic District may refer to:

in the United States
(by state)
Irvington Historic District (Indianapolis, Indiana)
North Irvington Gardens Historic District, Indianapolis, Indiana
Irvington Historic District (Irvington, Kentucky)
Irvington Historic District (Irvington, New York)
Irvington Historic District (Portland, Oregon)

See also
Irvington (disambiguation)